Butter cookies (or butter biscuits), also known as Danish biscuits, are cookies originating in Denmark consisting of butter, flour, and sugar. They are similar to shortbread cookies.

The butter cookie is often categorized as a "crisp cookie" due to its texture, caused in part by the quantity of butter and sugar. It is generally necessary to chill its dough to enable proper manipulation and handling.

Butter cookies at their most basic have no flavoring, but they are often flavored with vanilla, chocolate, and coconut, and/or topped with sugar crystals. They also come in a variety of shapes such as circles, squares, ovals, rings, and pretzel-like forms, and with a variety of appearances, including marbled, checkered or plain. Using piping bags, twisted shapes can be made. In some parts of the world, such as Europe and North America, butter cookies are often served around Christmas time. Butter cookies are also a very popular gift in Hong Kong, especially during Chinese New Year.

Danish butter cookies

Denmark has been a notable exporter of butter cookies for many years, in particular to the US and Asia. The cookies are made in many varieties, and exported industrial-grade butter cookies are typically packed and sold in tins, with Royal Dansk being a notable example. Due to the uniform packaging and labeling, it's also known as "The Blue Tin". Although cookies are originally an American innovation, many are from parts of Europe. The recipes of those cookies came with the European settlers to the American colonies. Denmark is known for maintaining the quality of their ingredients and their procedure since 1966. The signature flavor is derived from the Danish butter for which the standard was established in 1901 when the brand "Lurpak" was created.

See also

 Cookie butter
 Koulourakia
 Lengua de gato
 List of cookies
 Peanut butter cookie
 Petit-Beurre
 Shortbread

References

Further reading
 Friberg, Bo. The Professional Pastry Chef. 4th. New York: John Wiley & Sons, Inc., 2002.

Cookies
Foods featuring butter
Danish cakes
Christmas food